Emerald is a Canadian rural community located primarily in Prince County but also partially in Queens County in Prince Edward Island.

A railway junction named Emerald Junction was located in the community from the 1880s until the abandonment of the railway in Prince Edward Island on December 31, 1989.

See also
  List of communities in Prince Edward Island

Communities in Prince County, Prince Edward Island